Rev Thomas Streatfeild MA, FSA (5 January 1777 – 17 May 1848) was a renowned antiquarian and churchman in the early 19th century descended from the historic Streatfeild family. He lived on both sides of the Surrey Kent border, but is best known for his extensive research on the history of Kent.

Whilst at Tatsfield in Surrey he bought land in the adjoining parish of Westerham, Kent and built a house there – Chart's Edge – to his own design in 1822.

Antiquarian 
Thomas Streatfeild matriculated at Oriel College, Oxford on 19 May 1795 and graduated with a B.A. in 1799.

He devoted much time to a history of Kent but only one volume was ever published (Hundred of Blackheath) – some 50 volumes of his unpublished material are lodged in the British Museum.

He was also a skilled artist and he completed a number of wood engravings and drawings for the History.

Churchman 
As well as being an historian and writer, Thomas Streatfeild was an Anglican clergyman.  He was first Curate at St Mary’s, Long Ditton, Surrey, and at that time chaplain to the Duke of Kent and later Curate of St Mary the Virgin, Tatsfield, Surrey.

He altered and repaired the little church at Tatsfield by subscription in 1838, including the tower and porch at his own expense.  The following inscription can be found in the porch “Be it remembered that the masonry of this porch and tower is the free gift of the Rev. T. Streatfeild, of Chart’s Edge, Curate, 1838.  Thomas Barrett, Timothy Ringoss, churchwardens.”

Family 
Thomas Streatfeild was the son of Sandeforth Streatfeild (1750 – 28 July 1809) and Frances Hussey (1750-1821).

He married Harriet Champion (1776-1814), daughter of Alexander Champion, a wealthy merchant and whaler of Wandsworth, London, on 8 Oct 1800, and through her he acquired a considerable fortune.  In 1823 he married again, Clare, the daughter of Rev Thomas Harvey and the widow of Henry Woodgate.  He had 14 children, 9 with Harriet and 5 with Clare.

Ancestry

References

External links
 

Thomas
1777 births
1848 deaths
19th-century English Anglican priests
English antiquarians
Fellows of the Society of Antiquaries of London
People from Westerham